Illustrated Magazine or The Illustrated Magazine may refer to:

Hutchings' Illustrated California Magazine, San Francisco
The English Illustrated Magazine, London

See also
Disambiguation pages
Illustrated (disambiguation)
Illustrated News
Illustrated Weekly